Balama District is a district of Cabo Delgado Province in northern Mozambique. It covers 5,540 km² with 142,968 inhabitants.

The district is divided into four administrative posts, which include the following localities:
 Posto Administrativo de Balama:
 Balama
 Muripa
 Ntete
 Posto Administrativo de Impiiri:
 Namara
 Savaca
 Posto Administrativo de Kuékué:
 Jamira
 Tauane
 Posto Administrativo de Mavala:
 Mavala
 Mpaka

External links
District profile 

Districts in Cabo Delgado Province